The Fiji Hockey Federation (FHF) is the governing body of field hockey in Fiji, Oceania. Its headquarters are in Suva, Fiji. It is affiliated to the International Hockey Federation (IHF) and the Oceania Hockey Federation (OCF).

Emi NawaQetaki is the president of Hockey Association of Fiji and Jone Tuiipelehaki is the general secretary.

History

2016
Round 1 of 2016 Men Hockey World League Round and 2016 Women Hockey World League Round was held in Suva, Fiji from 27 June to 2 July 2016. Fiji took the top spot in men's as well as women's category. Dutta Leevan scored the maximum (23) goals in men's category and Dutta Tiara took the honors in the women's (27).

See also
Fiji men's national field hockey team
Oceania Hockey Federation

References

External links
 International Hockey Federation website
 Fiji Hockey Facebook

National members of the Oceania Hockey Federation
Hockey